The War Memorial of Korea is a museum located in Yongsan-dong, Yongsan-gu, Seoul, South Korea. It opened in 1994 on the former site of the army headquarters to exhibit and memorialize the military history of Korea. It was built for the purpose of preventing war through lessons from the Korean War and for the hoped for peaceful reunification of North and South Korea. The memorial building has six indoor exhibition rooms and an outdoor exhibition centre displaying war memorabilia and military equipment from China, South Korea and the United States.

History

The War Memorial was built to commemorate the military veterans and victims in the wars which led to the modern nation state. The museum also has the purpose of educating future generations by collecting, preserving, and exhibiting various historical relics and records related to the many wars fought in the country from a South Korean perspective.

Construction
The construction of the War Memorial of Korea was completed in December 1993. The project was carried out in consultation with military experts while collecting a wide range of exhibition items at home and abroad. Upon the completion of the interior, the memorial opened officially on June 10, 1994, and became the largest landmark of its kind in the world.

Surrounding area

On the grounds around the memorial, there are loudspeakers that broadcast patriotic messages.

In cloistered left and right galleries, flanking the facade of the main building, are rows of black marble monuments inscribed with the names of those who died during the Korean War, Vietnam War, clashes with North Korea since the Korean War and of policemen who died on duty. The plaza in the museum compound has an artificial waterfall, and around it are widespread rest areas so that visitors can picnic while enjoying the pleasant landscape. In the center of the plaza stands the Statue of Brothers, the elder a South Korean soldier and the younger a North Korean soldier, which symbolizes the situation of Korea's division.

Public transportation
 Samgakji Station exit 12

 Samgakji Station exit 12

Exhibition areas

13,000 items are displayed in six halls under different themes: Memorial Hall, War History, Korean War, Expeditionary Forces, ROK Armed Forces, and Large Equipment, plus the outside exhibition area. There are weapons and equipment from prehistoric times to the modern period as well as paintings of battlefields and sculptures of notable warriors and of An Jung-geun, who assassinated a former Resident-General in Manchuria in 1909. About 100 large weapons are displayed in the outside exhibition area on the lawns around the building.

Memorial Hall
Upon entering the memorial halls, this English text is inscribed:
Inscribed on this memorial are the names of the Republic of Korea Armed Forces Soldiers and Policemen killed in the Armed Forces Activation, Korean War, Vietnam War and Counter Infiltration Operation and the United Nations Forces Soldiers killed in the Korean War.

Indoor displays
Objects on display inside include:
 Full-sized replica of a turtle ship
 T-34/85 tank
 MiG-15UTI Midget, a trainer variant of the MiG-15 Fagot fighter aircraft.
 Piper L-4J Grasshopper observation aircraft, shown being used as an improved bomber during the Korean War.
 Stinson L-5G Sentinel observation aircraft
 Hiller OH-23G Raven observation helicopter
 Yakovlev Yak-18 trainer aircraft
 North American AT-6F Texan
 Soviet-made ZIL ZIS-110 limousine formerly used by Kim Il Sung

Outdoor display area
Items on display include:

Fixed-wing aircraft:
 de Havilland Canada U-6A Beaver 51-16837 (manufacturer number 386 and 1190). This aircraft was delivered to the U.S. Army as an L-20A on October 24, 1952. In 1962, this type of aircraft was re-designated the U-6A Beaver. Under the Military Assistance Program, it was transferred to the Republic of Korea Air Force.
 Antonov An-2 "Colt"
 Curtiss C-46D-20-CU Commando 44-78541. This aircraft was built in 1944. This  aircraft served with the 45th Troop Carrier Troop Squadron in the Pacific Theater during WWII. It was eventually operated as a TC-46D Commando training aircraft by the 2578th Reserve Flying Training Center at Ellington AFB, Texas until being mothballed in April 1956. It returned to service with the 1st Air Commando Wing at Eglin AFB, Florida, in 1963. It was finally transferred to the ROKAF as part of the Cold War-era Military Assistance Program on September 25, 1968.
 Fairchild C-123J Provider 56-4389. This aircraft was built in 1956 as a C-123B and later converted to a C-123J in the 1960s. This aircraft served with the Alaska ANG's 176th Tactical Airlift Group at Kulis ANGB, Alaska, servicing Alaskan Air Command radar sites until it was retired on January 21, 1976 and sent to MASDC. On May 5, 1977, it was sent to Korea as part of the Military Assistance Program.
 Fairchild C-119G Flying Boxcar marked as 53-3199. Formerly a C-119F, it was converted into a C-119G between 1955 and 1957 before being transferred to the Republic of China Air Force in 1970. It was later donated to the War Memorial of Korea and repainted with USAF markings.
 Boeing B-52D Stratofortress 55-0105. This aircraft is one of only three B-52s displayed outside the US. Served with the 4258th Strategic Wing at U-Tapao RTAFB in Thailand during the Vietnam War and the 96th Bombardment Wing at Dyess AFB, Texas. It is currently on a long-term loan to the War Memorial of Korea.
 Grumman S-2A Tracker 13-6707. This aircraft served with the US Navy’s Air Anti-Submarine Squadron 28 (VS-28) (initially nicknamed the “Hukkers” and later, the "Gamblers") aboard USS Wasp (CVS-18) beginning in 1962. Eventually, it was retired and transferred to ROKAF in 1972. During a reorganization of the Korean armed forces, it was later reassigned to the ROK Navy.
 North American F-51D-25-NA Mustang 44-73494. This aircraft was built at North American Aviation's Inglewood, California plant in 1944. It eventually served with the 109th Fighter Squadron of the Minnesota ANG, where it was stationed until 1952. In July of that year, it was transferred to the ROKAF as aircraft to serve in the Korean War, marked as aircraft "K-205".
 North American F-86F-30-NA Sabre 52-4308. The aircraft flew with the 3200th Proof Test Group at Eglin AFB, Florida beginning in 1953. It was then transferred to ROKAF in 1955.
 North American F-86D-35-NA Sabre 51-8502. This aircraft served with the USAF’s Air Defense Command before being transferred to the ROKAF.
 Northrop F-5A-40-NO Freedom Fighter 68-9046 (construction number 6412). This aircraft was one of the 190 F-5A airframes made for the ROKAF. It has a long serving career, flying with the ROKAF as late as 2000. It is currently painted with the twin tiger head insignia applied to all ROKAF F-5s.
 McDonnell Douglas F-4C-23-MC Phantom II 64-0766. This aircraft served with the USAF’s 12th Tactical Fighter Wing in the Vietnam War from 1967 to 1970. It was transferred to the 35th Tactical Fighter Squadron of the 347th Tactical Fighter Wing at Kunsan AB, South Korea. It was later used to train USAF air crews and went on to fly with the Illinois ANG’s 170th Tactical Fighter Squadron and the Oregon ANG’s 123rd Fighter Interceptor Squadron. After its flying career ended, it was transferred to Suwon AB, South Korea in August 1986 to be used as damage-control trainer before being put on display at the War Memorial of Korea.
 Shenyang J-6. This aircraft is a Chinese-made copy of the Soviet MiG-19 "Farmer". This particular aircraft was flown by KPAF defector Captain Lee Ung-Pyeong to South Korea 25 February 1983.
 Cessna T-41B Mescalero 67-15054. This aircraft flew with U.S. Army until it was sent to the ROKAF in 1971 as part of the Military Assistance Program to be used as a trainer. It is now marked "T-045."
 North American T-28A Trojan 51-7830. This aircraft was flown by the USAF as a trainer before being sent to the ROKAF in February 1961. This aircraft still wears its USAF "TA-830" buzz number.
 Lockheed T-33A-1-LO Shooting Star 53-5129. This aircraft flew with the USAF as a trainer until being sent to South Korea as part of the Foreign Military Sales program. It is still marked with a USAF-style "TR-129" buzz number.
 Cessna T-37C Tweet  72-1366. This aircraft was sold to the Republic of Korea Air Force and marked as "21366.". This aircraft type served with the ROKAF as a trainer, FAC, and light attack aircraft.
 KTX-1 Yeo-myung, prototype for the production KAI KT-1 Woongbi advanced trainer.
 Cessna O-1 Bird Dog 112537.
 Buwalho, the first domestically-produced Korean aircraft.

Helicopters
 Bell AH-1J “International Cobra” 29066. This helicopter was one of eight TOW-capable AH-1J helicopters sold to the ROK Army in 1978.
 Bell UH-1B Iroquois 62-12542. This helicopter formerly served as a helicopter gunship with the U.S. Navy’s HA(L)-3 Seawolves in the Vietnam War before being transferred to the South Korean air force.
 Sikorsky H-5H Dragonfly 49-2007. This helicopter was built 1949 under a USAF contract. For November 1960 to May 1960, it served with the Commonwealth of Pennsylvania as N6591D before being donated to the USAF Museum and eventually loaned to the War Memorial of Korea.
 Sikorsky HH-19B Chickasaw 53-4425. This helicopter was delivered to the USAF as a H-19B on September 2, 1954. It served in the USAF as a troop carrier and was eventually modified for air-sea rescue work and re-designated as an SH-19B (in 1962, all SH-19Bs were re-designated as HH-19Bs). It was eventually sent to the ROKAF in 1964.
 Aerospatiale SA319B Alouette III 770301. This helicopter formerly served with the ROK Navy. This aircraft sank a DPRK infiltration craft disguised as a fishing vessel with AS.11 missiles on 13 August 1983, killing 5 North Korean servicemen. This helicopter is painted with a kill marking commemorating the event.
 Bell OH-13H Sioux

Armored Vehicles:
 Two M4A3E8 Shermans
 T-34/85 tank
 M36 tank destroyer
 M56 Scorpion
 M46 Patton
 M47 Patton
 M48 Patton
 K1 88-Tank
 SU-100
 Type 59
 Type 63
 M113 APC
 M557 command vehicle
 M125 81mm mortar carrier
 K200 KIFV
 LVTP-7
 LVT-3 Bushmaster amphtrack

Artillery and Anti-Aircraft Guns:
 BM-13-16N Katyusha rocket launcher
 ZiS-3 76mm divisional gun
 M1938 120mm mortar
 M101 105mm howitzer
 M107 175mm self-propelled gun
 M110 8 inch howitzer
 M114 155 mm howitzer
 M1937 152mm howitzer-gun
 90mm anti-aircraft gun
 90mm T8 anti-tank gun
 ZPU-4
 M167 VADS
 Oerlikon 20 mm cannon on naval single and dual mounts
 Bofors 40 mm on naval quad and mounts
 5-inch gun in single mount from an ex-ROK Navy Fletcher-class destroyer

Missiles:
 MIM-14 Nike Hercules
 MIM-23 Hawk
 Scud missile
 MGM-52 Lance

Vessels:
 Chamsuri-class patrol boat painted and given faux battle damage to resemble PKM-357, a ROK Navy patrol boat sunk during the Second Battle of Yeonpyeong
 North Korean Submersible Infiltration Landing Craft (SILC) captured near Dadawpo, Busan on 3 December 1983
 Hurricane Aircat airboat used by ROK special forces during the Vietnam War

See also
 Gapyeong Canada Monument
 Korean War Veterans Memorial, Washington, D.C.
 Korean War Memorial, Canberra, Australia
 Korean War Memorial Wall, Ontario, Canada.
 National War Memorial (New Zealand)
 Seoul National Cemetery
 United Nations Memorial Cemetery, Busan, Korea
 Victorious War Museum, Pyongyang, its North Korean counterpart

References

External links

 Pictures of the War Memorial of Korea
 The War Memorial's official website 

Buildings and structures in Yongsan District
Military monuments and memorials
Military and war museums in South Korea
Monuments and memorials in South Korea
Museums in Seoul
Tourist attractions in Seoul
Korean War memorials and cemeteries
Korean War museums
Ministry of National Defense (South Korea)